Korawakgala, or koravakgal (wingstones), are stone balustrades, which are located on either side of the stairs/steps leading to the entrance or door of a religious building or structure. They form one of three distinct architectural features at the entrance of most Buddhist structures in Sri Lanka, being the sandakada pahana (moonstone), muragala (guardstones) and the korawakgala (wingstones).

The earliest known korawakgalas were simple and plain structures with no decorations at all, with time they evolved into elaborate structures with exquisite detailed carvings. Korawagala were initially constructed out of wood and then were built using bricks, without any carvings on it. These bricks were moulded in curved shapes to fit in. As they evolved simple stone plaques replaced the brick work. These plaques were detailed only with a few geometric lines to highlight the shape, later, a simple pot or a pillar was added on the exterior wall of the structure.

The structures subsequently evolved into a smoother shape, curving its edges and then a decorated floral design, incorporating flowers and leaves, entangled together. The most advanced stage of the korawakgala is a makaragala (dragonstones), which incorporates the addition of a heavily decorated makara (dragon), a mythological creature, which consists of various body parts from numerous different animals.  Each of these body parts represent the strongest characteristic of that animal. In addition to these, this imaginary beast is often depicted as breathing flames from its mouth.

elephant's trunk, representing dexterity
lion's paws, strength
crocodile's jaw, demand for respect
boar's ears, acute hearing
fishes body, movement
peacocks tail feathers, splendid beauty.

The makara and floral design were often combined, and in some instances, the outer and inner walls of the korawakgala were heavily carved. Although it is rare to find korawakgalas with decorated inner walls, with the majority being plain and unadorned.

There are two balustrades at main entrance of Lankatilaka Viharaya in Kandy. They are sometimes called Gajasinha balustrades because of the shape of the makara there.

See also
 Muragala
 Sandakada pahana

References

External links 
 
 

Architecture in Sri Lanka
Archaeology of Sri Lanka
Buddhist architecture